The Taraba State House of Assembly  is a branch of the Government of Taraba State, which serves as the legislative house where all legislative decisions and lawmaking for the governance of Taraba State is emanating.  It is a unicameral body with 24 members elected into the 24 state constituencies. The current Speaker of the Taraba State House of Assembly is Joseph Albasu Kunini from Lau constituency of Taraba State.

9th Taraba State House of Assembly Members 2019 - 2023

1. Joseph Albasu Kunini

          Honorable Speaker

Member Representing Lau Constituency

2. Haman Adama
        
          Deputy Speaker

Member Representing Bali I Constituency

Douglas Ndatse
          Majority Leader

Member Representing Donga Constituency

References

Taraba State